James Alexander Shohat (aka Jacques Chokhate (or Chokhatte), 18 November 1886, Brest-Litovsk – 8 October 1944, Philadelphia) was a Russian-American mathematician at the University of Pennsylvania who worked on the moment problem. He studied at the University of Petrograd and married the physicist Nadiascha W. Galli, the couple emigrating from Russia to the United States in 1923. 

He was an Invited Speaker of the ICM in 1924 at Toronto.

Selected works
 
 
 with J. Sherman: 
 
 
 
 with J. D. Tamarkin:

References

External links

20th-century American mathematicians
Mathematical analysts
1886 births
1944 deaths
Academic staff of Herzen University
Soviet emigrants to the United States